Dibiyapur is a municipality-based city in Auraiya district in the most populous state of Uttar Pradesh in India. It is situated on State Highway 21. It is linked to Phaphund railway station on Kanpur–Delhi section of Howrah–Delhi main line and Howrah–Gaya–Delhi line which is operated by North Central Railway. The district administrative headquarter of the city is Auraiya. The city is situated between Agra and Kanpur and is famous for industries and education.
Lower Ganga Canal passes through mid of the city.

Many industries including GAIL and NTPC are located in the town. As an initiative, the Government of Uttar Pradesh is constructing Plastic City in the city. Due to industrial settlements, the city has got the name of Audyogik Nagari. The city has notable reputation in the field of education as it houses many reputed Schools and Coaching Institutes.

Location
Dibiyapur city is located on State Highway 21 between Auraiya and Kannauj.
It is served by Phaphund railway station which is on Kanpur–Delhi section of Howrah–Delhi main line and Howrah–Gaya–Delhi line operated by North Central Railway at a distance 82 kilometer from Kanpur Central railway station and 148 km from .Lower Ganga Canal passes through the mid of the city.

General facts

 Coordinates: 26°38′09″N 79°34′24″E
 District: Auraiya
 District Headquarters: Kakor (Auraiya) Mukhyalaya
 State: Uttar Pradesh
 Main highways: State Highway 21
 Main railway line: Howrah–Delhi main line & Howrah–Gaya–Delhi line.
 Serving railway station: Phaphund railway station (PHD)
 Serving bus station: Under construction

Surrounding areas
 North: Kannauj, Rasulabad
 West: Etawah, Mainpuri
 East: Kanpur, Sahayal
 South: Auraiya, Jhansi

Transport

Rail

Dibiyapur is served by its local "A" graded Phaphund railway station (PHD) which is located on Kanpur–Delhi section of Howrah–Delhi main line and Howrah–Gaya–Delhi line.

Train statistics at Phaphund railway station
 Number of halting trains: 30
 Number of terminating trains: 3
 Number of departing trains: 3

Major trains at Phaphund railway station 

Some of the trains that are available at Phaphund railway station are below tabulated-

Road
Town is well connected by roads. It is connected to major cities like Agra, Mathura, Firozabad, Etawah, Kannauj, Hardoi, Shahjahanpur, Aligarh, Hathras, Kanpur, Allahabad etc. by bus network. It is located on State Highway 21. It is about 25 km from National Highway 19 (earlier, National Highway 2). Also it is connected to Kannauj (distance 60 km), which is located on the historical Grand Trunk Road.

Facts at a glance
 Local bus station: (under construction)
 Nearest bus station: Auraiya (located 22 km away)
 Main highways: State Highway 21
 Nearest National Highway: National Highway 19 (earlier, National Highway 2)
 Nearest railway station – Phaphund railway station
 Large-scale industries in vicinity – GAIL & NTPC Limited (NTPC).

Major places and their distance from Dibiyapur

Air
The nearest airport is Kanpur Airport located in Chakeri, Kanpur.

Nearest international airport is Chaudhary Charan Singh International Airport, Lucknow which is at 170 km from town.

Administration

General administration

District Magistrate – Mr. Sunil Kumar Verma

Dibiyapur comes under the district administration of Auraiya district. District administration is headed by the district magistrate and collector (DM) of Auraiya, who is an IAS officer. The DM is in charge of property records and revenue collection for the central government and oversees the elections held in the city. The DM is also responsible for maintaining law and order in the city.

Superintendent of Police – Mis. Charu Nigam

The district police is headed by a senior superintendent of police (SSP), who is an IPS officer.

Political administration

Member of Parliament – Prof. Ram Shankar Katheria

Dibiyapur comes under Etawah Lok Sabha constituency.

Prof. Ramshankar Katheria, (BJP) is the current Member of Parliament.

Member of Legislative Assembly – pradeep kumar singh

Dibiyapur is a constituency of the Uttar Pradesh Legislative Assembly covering the city of Dibiyapur.

Lakhan Singh contested Uttar Pradesh Assembly Election in 2017 as Bharatiya Janata Party candidate and defeated his close contestant Pradeep Kumar Yadav from Samajwadi Party with a margin of 12,094 votes.

He has been appointed as Minister of State in a Yogi Adityanath cabinet on 21 August 2019.

Chairman of Municipality (Nagar Panchayat) – Mr. Arvind Porwal

The local-government body is Nagar Panchayat Dibiyapur, which is headed by a Chairman.

Education
Dibiyapur is an educational hub in the Kanpur–Agra zone.

Notable schools and colleges

CBSE-affiliated schools and colleges 
 GAIL D.A.V. Public School
 Kendriya Vidyalaya, NTPC Dibiyapur
 St. Joseph's Senior Secondary School, NTPC, Dibiyapur

U.P. State Board colleges 
 Saraswati Vidya Mandir Inter College, Dibiyapur,

Other schools and colleges 
 Saraswati Shishu Mandir

 Gail D.A.V. Model School
 Vivekanand Gramodyog Mahavidyalaya

Demographics
As of the 2011 Indian census, there were 27,237 people living in Dibiyapur. The male population was 14,323 and females 12,914. Scheduled Castes constituted 4,915 of the population.

Religion demographics

Working profile

Climate
The town features mild winters, hot and dry summers and a monsoon season. However, the monsoons, though substantial in Dibiyapur, are not quite as heavy as the monsoon in other parts of India. This is a primary factor in Dibiyapur featuring a semi-arid climate as opposed to a humid subtropical climate.

The lowest recorded temperature in Dibiyapur was 1 °C; the highest was 45 °C.

Healthcare
Although Dibiyapur does not house plenty of health centers, it still has local hospitals, dispensaries, and clinic services which serve to the health standards. Many medical centers, pathology centers, sample collection centers are located in the town. The town has its local community health center (CHC Dibiyapur), along with many other private hospitals. Residents of the town generally prefer to visit nearby cities like Kanpur and Agra.

The town has its local community health center (CHC Dibiyapur) along with many other private hospitals.

In early period of COVID-19 pandemic when first 4 COVID-19 patients were found in Auraiya district, they were all admitted to isolation centers made in Community Health Center (CHC Dibiyapur).

Hospitals and dispensaries in the town
 Community health center (CHC Dibiyapur)
 Dr. G. P. Chaudhary clinic
 Krishna Medical Center
 Dhanvantari Hospital
 GAIL Vihar Dispensary
 NTPC Health Center
 Radhey Pediatrics Centers

Economy

Dibiyapur is a notable industrial town in the Kanpur–Agra region. The town is well equipped with industries. Many small scale industries also operate in the town. Agriculture being the most popular occupation in the rural sides of the town, shops, and organised retail outlets also serve as "money raisers in the town".

Large-scale industries

Dibiyapur is a notable industrial town of Auraiya district which has installations of India's leading public sector enterprises viz.
 Cycle power plant of NTPC.
 Pata Petrochemical plant
 Gas compressor station of GAIL (previously known as Gas Authority of India Limited).

Small-scale industries
The Rice-mills and Dal-mills are working well. Other than these mills some steel furniture and cement products small scale industries are there in town located at different places. The raw material for these small-scale industries is imported from Agra and Kanpur. Mainly, the rice, pulses and desi ghee is transported at large scale to the other districts and states. In the Dibiyapur town itself the wooden furniture work is on large scale and due to its cost and quality factor, the furniture has made a good place in the market of nearby districts.

Market places

Bhagwatiganj Market located in heart of town, is a main shopping market in Dibiyapur where you can get all sorts of items. Sahayal Road Market and Vedic Market are also prominent marketplaces in the town. Shalimar Shopping Complex located in Gail Gaon is modern marketplace equipped with all types of modern facilities and caters for all needs related to market.

The town also houses a Naveen Mandi Samiti popular in nearby districts and town for being a space of selling and buying wholegrains, vegetables, fruits, and other agricultural-based products. The town houses other three small vegetable and fruit markets i.e. Badi Sabzi Mandi, Choti Sabji Mandi, Vimal Dwar Mandi. Moreover, the town has a good market for milk products like desi ghee, panner, etc. and sweets.

Modern townships

Gail Gaon, a small township in the outskirts of town is well equipped and well planned residential society having all types of dream facilities that a person needs.

GAIL has also established a compressor station near Gail Gaon which has one more residential society named as GAIL Vihar, just like as Gail Gaon, a small, well-facilitated colony.

A residential township is also built named as NTPC Township.

A residential township is also built for Central Industrial Security Force employees at Auraiya Road, known as CISF Township.

The town has a big market named Bhagwatiganj Market in the heart of main town.

Notable buildings

Religious attractions
 Devi Mahamai Mandir, Gahesar
 Sehud Hanuman Mandir, Sehud
 Sarveshwar Mandir, Gail Gaon
 Panchmukhi Shiv Mandir, Sahayal Tiraha

Historical attractions
 Pani Ki Chakki, Nahar Bazaar

Civic and public buildings
 Indradhanush Club, Gail Gaon
 Samudayik Kendra, Alok Nagar (NTPC)
 Sargam Auditorium
 Open Gymnasium, Gail Gaon
 Shalimar Shopping Complex

Festivals and Carnivals

Hindu Festivals 

According to Hindu calendar Vikram Samvat lunar calendar chaitra is considered as first month.

Navaratri & Rama Navami

Festivals of Hindus starts from very first day as chaitra navratri. In the period of nine days festival the forms of Shakti are worshipped. On ninth day birthday of God Rama is celebrated and jhanki of lord Rama passes from the heart of the town.

Rakshabandhan

Raksha Bandhan is also known as Rakhi.  On this day sisters tie rakhi on the right hand of their brothers and according to rituals brothers give gift to their sisters and give assurance of protection in any mishap or calamity.

Deepawali

Deepawali or Diwali is one of the biggest and most important Hindu festivals. It is celebrated with great enthusiasm throughout town. It is a festival of lights that it falls on the Amavasya of the month of Kartik every year according to Hindu calendar.

Holi

Holi is a festival of colours. It is celebrated every year on the purnima in the month of Falgun. The festival starts with lighting a bonfire in the mid night. On next day morning colours are spread out by the people over each other.

Muslim Festivals 

The Muslim calendar begins with the month of Muharram.

Muharram
The tenth day of this month is spent in great mourning, as it was on this day that the Prophet's grandson Hussain, achieved martyrdom.
The long processions with their Taziahs which are the gorgeous replicas of the martyr's tomb, the masked dancers and the colorful crowds, give Muharram the appearance of a happy festival but in reality it is an expression of grief and sorrow.

Mawlid (Barah Wafat Celebration)

Id-e-Milad is a festival of both rejoicing and mourning. The festival of Id-e-Milad popularly known as Barah Wafat the twelfth day is one of the important festival in the Muslim calendar. The day commemorates the birth and also the death anniversary of Prophet Mohammed. It falls on the twelfth day of the third month Rabi-ul-Awwal of the Muslim calendar. The word 'barah' signifies the twelve days of the Prophet's sickness.

Eid-ul-Fitr

Eid ul-Fitr was originated by the Islamic prophet Muhammad. It is observed on the first of the month of Shawwal at the end of the month of Ramadan, during which Muslims undergo a period of fasting. Thus, Eid ul-Fitr is also known as the Feast of Breaking the Fast and the Lesser Eid. As per the Hijiri calendar Eid ul-Fitr is celebrated on the first day of the month known as Shawwal, it is the tenth month of the Islamic calendar.

Bakra Eid

Eid al-Adha 'Feast of the Sacrifice' also called the Sacrifice Feast. It honors the willingness of Ibrahim (Abraham) to sacrifice his son, as an act of obedience to God's command. Before Abraham sacrificed his son, God provided a male goat to sacrifice instead. In commemoration of this, an animal is sacrificed and divided into three parts: one third of the share is given to the poor and needy; another third is given to relatives, friends and neighbors; and the remaining third is retained by the family.

Sikh Festivals 

The festivities in the Sikh religion revolve around the anniversaries of the 10 Sikh Gurus. These Gurus were responsible for shaping the beliefs of the Sikhs. Their birthdays, known as Gurpurab, are occasions for celebration and prayer among the Sikhs.

The birth of the Guru Gobind Singh Ji is celebrated as Prakash Utsav in the town as it is celebrated in other parts of country by the Sikh Community.

Culture

Fairs & exhibitions
 Dibiyapur Pradarshni (Numaish Maidan)
 Navratri Mela (Devi Mahamai Mandir, Gahesar)
 Budhwa Mangal Mela (Sehud Hanuman Mandir)
 Dussehra Mela (Vivekanand Sports Complex)
 Deepawali Mela (Gail Gaon)

Sports
Cricket and football are the most popular sports in the town. Vivekanand Sports Complex at Gail Gaon and Ambedkar Stadium in NTPC Township serve for the outdoor games. Indradhanush Club at Gail Gaon provides facilities of Indoor games and spaces a good Gymnasium and Swimming Pool.

There are several other grounds, or maidans like Vaidik ground, VGM ground, Mandi Samiti ground located in the town.
The school grounds of the town have also organised many Zonal level sports tournament like DAV National Sports.

See also
 Auraiya District
 Sahayal
 Phaphund railway station

References

External links

  
 Auraiya district profile
 Tourist Places at Auraiya

Cities and towns in Auraiya district
Dibiyapur
Cities in Uttar Pradesh